Events from the year 1975 in Michigan. 

The Associated Press (AP) selected the state's top news stories of 1975 as follows:
 The disappearance of former Teamsters president Jimmy Hoffa on July 30 from the parking lot of the Machus Red Fox restaurant in Bloomfield Township where he had planned to meet with organized crime figures, Anthony Provenzano and Anthony Giacalone;
 The resignation of Michigan Supreme Court Justice and former Governor John Swainson on November 7, five days after his conviction on three counts of perjury charges for lying to a federal grand jury investigating Swainson's role in a bribery conspiracy involving an effort to secure a new trial for a convicted burglar;
 An upturn in the automobile business following a major slump in 1974;
 The June 6 escape by helicopter of con man Dale Otto Remling from the nation's largest walled prison (Southern Michigan Prison in Jackson, Michigan) and his capture one day later at a bar 10 miles away in Leslie, Michigan;
 The Michigan Legislature's struggles with a budget deficit;
 Flooding in southern lower Michigan reported to be the worst since 1947;
 Continued fallout from the Michigan PBB contamination incident in which a flame retardant chemical feed was mixed with livestock feed, distributed to Michigan farms, and fed to 1.5 million chickens, 30,000 cattle, 5,900 pigs, and 1,470 sheep;
 The Ann Arbor Hospital Murders in which 10 patients at the Veterans Hospital in Ann Arbor died mysteriously from respiratory failure, later resulting in the 1976 trial and conviction of two nurses, Filipina Narciso and Leonora Perez; and
 The automobile industry introduces rebates to spur sales.

The AP also selected the state's top sports stories as follows:
 Hudson High School setting a national high school record by extending its winning streak to 72 games (before losing to Ishpeming in the Class C championship game);
 The trade that sent Mickey Lolich from the Detroit Tigers to the New York Mets for Rusty Staub;
 The NCAA investigation into Michigan State Spartans football;
 The opening of the Pontiac Silverdome, a domed stadium built at a cost of $55.7 million;
 The Detroit Tigers have a 19-game losing streak to set a modern American League record;
 The Northern Michigan Wildcats football team won the NCAA Division II Football Championship;
 The 1975 Michigan Wolverines football team compiles an 8–1–2 record in the regular season, loses to Ohio State, and goes on to lose to Oklahoma in the 1976 Orange Bowl;
 The 1975 Detroit Tigers compile a 57–102 record, the second worst season in club history to that time;
 Ten black players from the Michigan State Spartans men's basketball team were suspended after walking out; three white players later transferred;  
 Michigan high school football begins a playoff system with championships won by Livonia Franklin, Dearborn Divine Child, Ishpeming, and Crystal Falls Forest Park;
 The trade of Dave Bing for Kevin Porter;
 Mount Pleasant declaring itself the "City of Champions"; and
 Marcel Dionne signing with the Los Angeles Kings and the Detroit Red Wings get Terry Harper and Don Maloney as compensation.

Office holders

State office holders

 Governor of Michigan: William Milliken (Republican) 
 Lieutenant Governor of Michigan: James Damman (Republican) 
 Michigan Attorney General: Frank J. Kelley (Democrat)
 Michigan Secretary of State: Richard H. Austin (Democrat)
 Speaker of the Michigan House of Representatives: William A. Ryan (Democrat)
 Majority Leader of the Michigan Senate: Robert VanderLaan (Republican)/Milton Zaagman (Republican)
 Chief Justice, Michigan Supreme Court: Thomas M. Kavanagh

Mayors of major cities
 Mayor of Detroit: Coleman Young
 Mayor of Grand Rapids: Lyman Parks
 Mayor of Flint: Paul Calvin Visser
 Mayor of Lansing: Gerald W. Graves
 Mayor of Ann Arbor: James E. Stephenson (Republican)

Federal office holders
 United States Senator from Michigan: Philip Hart (Democrat)
 United States Senator from Michigan: Robert P. Griffin (Republican) 
 United States Representative, District 1: John Conyers (Democrat)
 United States Representative, District 2: Marvin L. Esch (Republican)
 United States Representative, District 3: Garry E. Brown (Republican)
 United States Representative, District 4: J. Edward Hutchinson (Republican)
 United States Representative, District 5: Richard Vander Veen (Democrat)
 United States Representative, District 6: Bob Carr (Democrat)
 United States Representative, District 7: Donald W. Riegle Jr. (Democrat)
 United States Representative, District 8: J. Bob Traxler (Democrat)
 United States Representative, District 9: Guy Vander Jagt (Republican)
 United States Representative, District 10: Elford Albin Cederberg (Republican)
 United States Representative, District 11: Philip Ruppe (Republican)
 United States Representative, District 12: James G. O'Hara (Democrat)
 United States Representative, District 13: Charles Diggs (Democrat)
 United States Representative, District 14: Lucien N. Nedzi (Democrat)
 United States Representative, District 15: William D. Ford (Democrat)
 United States Representative, District 16: John Dingell (Democrat)
 United States Representative, District 17: William M. Brodhead (Democrat)
 United States Representative, District 18: James Blanchard (Democrat)
 United States Representative, District 19: William Broomfield (Republican)

Population

Sports

Baseball
 1975 Detroit Tigers season – Under head coach Ralph Houk, the team compiled a record of 57–102, finished in last place in the American League East, and was outscored by opponents, 786 to 570. The team's batting leaders were Ben Oglivie with a .286 batting average, Willie Horton with 25 home runs and 92 RBIs, and Ron LeFlore with 28 stolen bases.  The team's pitching leaders were Mickey Lolich with 12 wins and 139 strikeouts and John Hiller with a 2.17 earned run average.

American football
 1975 Detroit Lions season – Under head coach Rick Forzano, the team compiled a 7–7 record and finished second in the NFC Central. The team's leaders included Joe Reed with 1,181 passing yards, Dexter Bussey with 696 rushing yards, Ray Jarvis with 501 receiving yards, and Errol Mann with 67 points scored.
 1975 Michigan Wolverines football team – Under head coach Bo Schembechler, the team compiled an 8–2–2 record and was ranked No. 8 in the final AP and Coaches Polls. The team's two losses were to No. 1 ranked Ohio State and No. 3 ranked Oklahoma in the 1976 Orange Bowl, The team's statistical leaders included Rick Leach with 680 passing yards, Gordon Bell with 1,390 rushing yards (Rob Lytle added 1,030 rushing yards), and Jim Smith with 553 receiving yards.
 1975 Michigan State Spartans football team – Under head coach Denny Stolz, the Spartans compiled a 7–4 record.

Basketball
 1974–75 Detroit Pistons season – Under head coach Ray Scott, the Pistons compiled a 40–42 record. The team's statistical leaders included Bob Lanier with 1,823 points and 914 rebounds and Dave Bing with 610 assists.
 1974–75 Michigan Wolverines men's basketball team – Under head coach Johnny Orr, the team compiled a 19–8 record and was ranked No. 19 in the final AP Poll.

Ice hockey
 1974–75 Detroit Red Wings season – Under head coach Alex Delvecchio, the team compiled a 23–45–12 record and finished fourth in the Norris Division. The team's statistical leaders included Danny Grant with 50 goals and Marcel Dionne with 74 assists and 121 points.
 Great Lakes Invitational -

Other

Music
Albums and singles by Michigan artists or centered on Michigan topics that were released or became hits in 1975 include the following:
 "Some Kind of Wonderful", a single by Flint's Grand Funk Railroad, was released in December 1974, reached No. 3 on the Billboard Hot 100 and was ranked as the No. 6 song on Billboard Year-End Hot 100 singles of 1975. 
 "One of These Nights, a single co-written by Detroit native Glenn Frey (with Don Henley), was released in May 1975, reached No. 1 on the Billboard Hot 100, and was ranked as the No. 10 song on Billboard Year-End Hot 100 singles of 1975. 
 "Best of My Love, a single co-written by Detroit natives Glenn Frey and J.D. Souther (with Don Henley), was released in November 1974, reached No. 1 on the Billboard Hot 100, and was ranked as the No. 13 song on Billboard Year-End Hot 100 singles of 1975. 
 "Boogie On Reggae Woman", a single from Detroit native Stevie Wonder, was released in November 1974, reached No. 1 on the Billboard R&B chart, and was ranked as the No. 26 song on Billboard Year-End Hot 100 singles of 1975. 
 "Bad Time", a single by Grand Funk Railroad, was released in March 1975, reached No. 4 on the Billboard Hot 100, and was ranked as the No. 62 song on Billboard Year-End Hot 100 singles of 1975. 
 "Only Women Bleed", a single by Detroit native Alice Cooper, was released in April 1975, reached No. 12 on the Billboard R&B chart, and was ranked as the No. 63 song on Billboard Year-End Hot 100 singles of 1975. Cooper began his Welcome to My Nightmare tour on March 21 in Kalamazoo, Michigan. The elaborate show is among the largest stage spectacles of the decade.
 Beautiful Loser, the eighth studio album by Bob Seger, was released in April 1975. The album included the songs "Beautiful Loser", "Katmandu", and "Nutbush City Limits".
 Mahogany, a soundtrack album by Diana Ross, was released in October 1975 and reached No. 20 on the Billboard album chart.  The single "Theme from Mahogany (Do You Know Where You're Going To)" reached No. 1 on the Billboard Hot 100.
 Ted Nugent, the debut studio album from Ted Nugent, was released in September 1975, reached No. 28 on the Billboard album chart, and was certified double platinum.  It included the single "Stranglehold".
 Caught in the Act, a live album from Grand Funk Railroad, was released in August 1975 and reached No. 21 on the Billboard album chart.
 A Quiet Storm, an album by Smokey Robinson, was released in March 1975. The single "Baby That's Backatcha" reached No. 1 on the R&B chart.
 You, a studio album by Aretha Franklin, was released in October 1975 and reached No. 83 on the Billboard album chart.
 A Song for You, a studio album by The Temptations, was released in January 1975 and reached No. 13 on the Billboard album chart. The album featured two No. 1 R&B hits: "Happy People" and "Shakey Ground"
 On October 9, rock band Kiss earned publicity by playing the homecoming dance of Cadillac High School in Cadillac, Michigan.
 On December 31, Elvis Presley performed before the biggest audience of his career, at Pontiac's Silverdome. During the show, Elvis ripped his pants onstage and had to leave to change.

Chronology of events

January

February

March

April

May

June

July

August

September

October

November

December

Births
 January 2 - Dax Shepard, actor (Parenthood, CHiPs), in Highland Township, Oakland County, Michigan
 July 1 - Sufjan Stevens, singer/songwriter, in Detroit
 July 9 - Jack White, in Detroit

Gallery of 1975 births

Deaths
 April 6 - Arthur J. Lacy, politician, lawyer, and philanthropist at age 98 in Birmingham
 March 18 - Biggie Munn, American football player and coach and athletic director, at age 66 in Lansing
 July 30 - Jimmy Hoffa, labor leader, disappeared at age 62 in Bloomfield Township

Gallery of 1975 deaths

References